Eure is a department in Normandy in Northwestern France, named after the river Eure. Its prefecture is Évreux. In 2019, Eure had a population of 599,507.

History 
Eure is one of the original 83 departments created during the French Revolution on 4 March 1790. It was created from part of the former province of Normandy. The name in fact is taken from the Eure river flowing mainly in this department.

After the allied victory at Waterloo, Eure was occupied by Prussian troops between June 1815 and November 1818.

In the wake of Louis-Napoléons December coup of 1851, Eure was one of the departments placed under a state of emergency in order to avert resistance to the post-republican régime.   In the event fewer than 100 government opponents in Eure were arrested.

Geography 
Eure is part of the current region of Normandy and is surrounded by the departments of Seine-Maritime, Oise, Val-d'Oise, Yvelines, Eure-et-Loir, Orne, and Calvados. It also has a short coastline within the Atlantic Ocean across the Seine estuary.

The department is a largely wooded plateau intersected by the valleys of the river Seine and its tributaries. The altitude varies from sea level in the north to 248 metres above it in the south.

Principal towns

The most populous commune is Évreux, the prefecture. As of 2019, there are 5 communes with more than 10,000 inhabitants:

Demographics

Politics

The President of the Departmental Council is Sébastien Lecornu of La République En Marche!.

Presidential elections 2nd round

Current National Assembly Representatives

Tourism 
The main tourist attraction is Giverny ( from Vernon) where Claude Monet's house and garden can be seen, as well as other places of interest (see external links, below).

The Abbey of Bec and the Château-Gaillard near Les Andelys are other important tourist attractions.

The Château of Buisson de May was built by the royal architect Jacques Denis Antoine from 1781 to 1783.

See also
Cantons of the Eure department
Communes of the Eure department
Arrondissements of the Eure department
Château d'Harcourt
Château de Gisors

References

External links
  Departmental Council website
  Prefecture website
  Eure Tourisme

 
1790 establishments in France
Departments of Normandy
States and territories established in 1790